Niabella drilacis is a Gram-negative and rod-shaped bacterium from the genus of Niabella which has been isolated from a leech (Hirudo verbana) from Biebertal in Germany.

References

Chitinophagia
Bacteria described in 2013